India–Sri Lanka maritime boundary agreements were signed in 1974 and 1976 between India and Sri Lanka to define the international maritime boundary between the two countries. Treaties on maritime boundary were necessary to facilitate law enforcement and resource management, and to avoid conflict, in the waters since both countries located closely in the Indian ocean, particularly in Palk Strait.

The first agreement was regarding the maritime boundary in waters between Adam's Bridge and the Palk Strait, and came into force on July 8, 1974. The second agreement, which was signed on March 23 and entered into force on May 10, 1976, defined the maritime boundaries in the Gulf of Mannar and the Bay of Bengal.

India, Sri Lanka and Maldives signed another agreement for determination of the tri-junction point in the Gulf of Mannar in July 1976. Later in November, India and Sri Lanka signed another agreement to extend the maritime boundary in the Gulf of Mannar.

Agreements 
The summarised agreements are:

See also 
 India–Sri Lanka relations
 List of maritime boundary treaties

References 

History of Sri Lanka (1948–present)
India–Sri Lanka relations
Treaties of India
Treaties of Sri Lanka
1974 in India
1976 in international relations
Maritime boundaries
Boundary treaties